Ole Riber Rasmussen (28 September 1955 – 11 February 2017) was a Danish sport shooter. He won the silver medal in Skeet shooting in the 1984 Summer Olympics in Los Angeles and represented his country in three other Summer Olympics in 1988,  1992 and 1996

References

1955 births
2017 deaths
Skeet shooters
Shooters at the 1984 Summer Olympics
Shooters at the 1988 Summer Olympics
Shooters at the 1992 Summer Olympics
Shooters at the 1996 Summer Olympics
Olympic medalists in shooting
Olympic shooters of Denmark
Olympic silver medalists for Denmark
Danish male sport shooters
ISSF rifle shooters
Medalists at the 1984 Summer Olympics